Pea enation mosaic virus (PEMV) is really two plant pathogenic viruses. The two RNAs of the disease are now categorised as two separate, mutualistic viruses: 
 Pea enation mosaic virus 1 is an Enamovirus
 Pea enation mosaic virus 2 is an Umbravirus

They are spread by green- or pea aphids and affects such legumes as pea, alfalfa, broadbean or sweet pea mostly in temperate regions.

Symptoms include chlorotic, translucent or necrotic lesions, malformation of leaves and stipules, and plant distortion. However, the most characteristic symptom is the formation of enations on the abaxial, i.e. downy, leaf side. Enations are derived from the cells of vascular bundles undergoing hyperplasia.

References

External links
ICTVdB - The Universal Virus Database: Pea enation mosaic virus
Family Groups - The Baltimore Method

Viral plant pathogens and diseases